John Walker Maury (May 15, 1809 – February 2, 1855) was an American municipal politician from the Democratic Party. He served as the fifteenth mayor of the City of Washington for a single two-year term, from 1852 to 1854.

Early life
John Walker Maury was born in Caroline County, Virginia in 1809 to a prominent Virginia family. His great-grandfather, Reverend James Maury, had founded the Maury Classical School for Boys at which Thomas Jefferson was his student for two years. His grandfather, Walker Maury, was headmaster of a school in Williamsburg; his great-uncle, "Consul" James Maury, was the United States' first consul to Liverpool, England, appointed by George Washington; and his second cousin, Matthew Fontaine Maury, was a famous and accomplished oceanographer.

He moved at 17 to the City of Washington (as Washington, D.C. was then called), where he established a law practice. He married five years later, in 1831, to Isabel Foyles, eventually producing 15 children.

Political career
At the age of 26, John Walker Maury was elected to the Common Council of Washington City, serving for five years until declining to run again in 1840. However, one year afterward he was elected to the Board of Aldermen. After eleven years as an alderman, Maury was elected as Mayor in 1852.

Sixty years after the death of his father, William Arden Maury eulogized Maury by associating him with three main efforts. First, he claims that Maury and the philanthropist William Wilson Corcoran convinced Congress to appropriate funds for the Government Hospital for the Insane, now known as St. Elizabeths. Second, he notes that Maury was mayor when Congress funded a study under the supervision of Montgomery C. Meigs to improve the public water supply by means of the Washington Aqueduct. Third, he recounts that Maury provided payments to sculptor Clark Mills to complete the statue of Andrew Jackson on horseback that stands in Lafayette Square, across the street from the White House. Mills later repaid Maury from a commission for an equestrian statue of George Washington.

Despite these contributions, Maury merits only a passing and dismissive mention in Constance McLaughlin Green's Pulitzer Prize-winning work, Washington, Village and Capital, 1800-1878, in which she writes that "the gentle John Maury was beloved as a man but was a singularly inept politician.” In 1854, at the peak of the Know-Nothing movement in American politics, Maury was unseated by Know-Nothing candidate John T. Towers. Maury died one year later, shortly before his 46th birthday.

Like some other early mayors of the City of Washington, such Robert Brent and Benjamin G. Orr, Maury was involved in slavery. In the United States Census of 1840, Maury's household included five enslaved people including a boy and a girl under 10 years old. In 1850, Maury reported an enslaved 23-year-old woman. In 1862, Maury's widow Isabel filed a petition under the District of Columbia Compensated Emancipation Act seeking compensation for a family of six enslaved people who were emancipated under the Act. According to her petition, the family had been willed to her by her late husband. The enslaved were Eliza Dyson and her five children, ages 4 to 15.

At the time of his death in 1855, Maury was president of the National Bank of the Metropolis, a position he had assumed after the death of John P. Van Ness in 1846. Maury was interred at Congressional Cemetery. His son William Arden Maury would recall that "There was, perhaps, never a greater outpouring of the people from President Pierce and the venerable Senator Benton down to the humblest citizen than was seen at his funeral."

Maury Elementary, one of the District of Columbia Public Schools, was named in honor of John Walker Maury upon its construction in 1886.

References

Mayors of Washington, D.C.
1809 births
1855 deaths
Burials at the Congressional Cemetery
People from Caroline County, Virginia
Maury family of Virginia
American slave owners